Bombay to Goa is a 1972 Indian Hindi-language road comedy film directed by S. Ramanathan, starring Mehmood, Amitabh Bachchan and Aruna Irani, with Shatrughan Sinha in a supporting role. The movie is known particularly for its catchy tunes.

It was a "Super hit" At the box office. The film is a remake of a 1966 hit Tamil film Madras to Pondicherry.

It was reported that the 2004 Marathi movie Navra Maza Navsacha, which was also remade in Kannada in 2007 as Ekadantha was heavily inspired by this movie.

The Hindu had reported that Rajiv Gandhi was offered the lead role by Mehmood but he had turned it down.

Plot

The lives of Atmaram and his wife are turned upside down when they see their daughter, Mala's pictures in a magazine. They arrange for Mala's marriage with the son of Ramlal. Mala is opposed to marrying anyone who she has not met, and is at the same time thrilled that the two persons she trusted, one Verma, and the other Sharma had actually submitted her pictures to a magazine, and were now willing to sign her up for a Bollywood movie. Mala is not able to understand her parents' opposition on her way to fame, and runs away from home with a lot of money and hands this money to Sharma and Verma. Greed overtakes Sharma, leading to the death of Verma. Mala, who witnessed Sharma kill Verma, now is on the run for her life. She boards a bus from Bombay which is bound for Goa. Sharma soon overtakes her, and has one of his armed men on the bus to kill her. And then arrives Mala's admirer and bodyguard Ravikumar, who not only protects Mala, but also accompanies her throughout the journey. Mala starts to trust and subsequently fall in love with Ravikumar. The bus journey is adventurous with the passengers, a totally mixed bunch, from all over India, different religions, cultures, and faiths, all thrown together for this journey. The bus is in the "control" of driver Rajesh, and conductor, Khanna.

Cast 

 Amitabh Bachchan as Ravikumar Singh (Ravi)
 Aruna Irani as Mala Iyer
 Shatrughan Sinha as Mr. Sharma
 Mehmood as Khanna (Bus Conductor) 
 Anwar Ali as Rajesh (Bus Driver) 
 Nazir Hussain as Atmaram Iyer (Mala's father) 
 Dulari as Mrs. Atmaram Iyer (Mala's mother) 
 Agha as Ramlal Singh (Ravi's father) 
 Parveen Paul as Mrs. Ramlal Singh (Ravi's mother)
 Manmohan as Mr. Verma
 Manorama as Young Girl's Mother
 Lalita Pawar as Kashibai
 Mukri as South Indian Passenger 
 Pakoda Kadhar as Pakoda Boy
 Randhir as Kader Bhai
 Sunder as Pandit
 Keshto Mukherjee as Bengali Passenger
 Yusuf Khan as Boxer John Ragada
 Babbanlal Yadav as Boxer's Henchman
 Asit Sen as Dhaba Owner
 Birbal as Marathi Passenger
 Raj Kishore as Passenger 
 Darshan Lal as Army man
 Kishore Kumar as himself (Special Appearance)
 Mehmood Jr. as Dhaba Waiter (Special Appearance)
 Usha Iyer as herself (Special appearance)

Soundtrack
 "Dekha Na Haye Re" - Kishore Kumar
 "Tum Meri Zindagi Mein" - Kishore Kumar, Lata Mangeshkar
 "Listen To The Pouring Rain" - Usha Uthup
 "Dil Tera Hai Main Bhi Teri" - Lata Mangeshkar, Kishore Kumar
 "Haye Haye Yeh Thanda Paani" - Asha Bhosle
 "Yeh Mehki Mehki Thandi Hawa" - Kishore Kumar

References

External links
 

1972 films
Hindi remakes of Tamil films
1970s adventure comedy films
Indian adventure comedy films
1970s Hindi-language films
Films scored by R. D. Burman
1970s comedy road movies
Films directed by S. Ramanathan
Indian comedy road movies
1972 comedy films